SimRefinery is a computer management simulation game designed to simulate Chevron's Richmond refinery operation. It was developed by the Maxis Business Simulations division of Maxis in 1993. John Hiles, who was the head of the Maxis division, was a lead designer on the project.

Development
After the success of SimCity, Maxis received numerous requests from various companies to develop simulations for their industries. After rejecting many requests from other companies, the team eventually agreed to make a prototype of SimRefinery for Chevron:

Release and rediscovery
As a commissioned business aid, it was not made available to the public. Until 2020, little information about the game had existed, though Maxis had discussed its creation and some screenshots existed. Most of the assets stayed with Maxis Business Simulations, which Maxis eventually divested in 1996. The division rebranded itself as Thinking Tools Inc. and continued to develop similar corporate simulations, but eventually had to shutter itself, and most of its assets were destroyed.

In May 2020, librarian Phil Salvador published a long form investigative article about Maxis Business Simulations and SimRefinery featuring interviews with Hiles and other members of the division. Ars Technica reported on the article, which led to a commentor on the website uncovering a floppy disc that contains an in-development build of the game. The anonymous commenter then uploaded a digital copy to the Internet Archive to work within its DOSBox emulator. 

This emulated version reveals more details about the "gameplay" of SimRefinery. The game resembles SimCity with different graphics, disasters, and rules, the former to represent oil tanker ports, petroleum storage and piping systems. The user's role in the simulation was the plant manager of a refinery. One of the things the user learned was about supply and demand and how it affects the financial situation. The game was not defined to be an accurate representation of the chemical processes of a plant, as this would have been considered extremely dangerous. Instead, it was intended to show how disparate systems of a chemical plant may end up interacting at the larger scale, incorporating the financial, production, and logistics related to operating a plant. The game allowed some "disasters" to be created by creating explosive mixtures of components that set off fires, as well as external events that may disrupt the plant. The game was not considered to be a fully finished product based on the version received by the Internet Archive.

References

External links
 SimRefinery on the Internet Archive

1993 video games
Business simulation games
Maxis Sim games
Video games developed in the United States
Rediscovered works